Orgueil is a scientifically important carbonaceous chondrite meteorite that fell in southwestern France in 1864.

History
The Orgueil meteorite fell on May 14, 1864, a few minutes after 20:00 local time, near Orgueil in southern France. About 20 stones fell over an area of 5-10 square kilometres. A specimen of the meteorite was analyzed that same year by François Stanislaus Clöez, professor of chemistry at the Musée d'Histoire Naturelle, who focused on the organic matter found in this meteorite. He wrote that it contained carbon, hydrogen, and oxygen, and its composition was very similar to peat from the Somme valley or to the lignite of Ringkohl near Kassel. An intense scientific discussion ensued, continuing into the 1870s, as to whether the organic matter might have a biological origin.

Curation and Distribution
Orgueil specimens are in curation by bodies around the world. Given the large mass, samples are in circulation for nondestructive (and with sufficient justification, destructive) study and test.

Source: Grady, M. M. Catalogue of Meteorites, 5th Edition, Cambridge University Press

Composition and classification
Orgueil is one of five known meteorites belonging to the CI chondrite group (see meteorites classification), and is the largest. This group has a composition that is essentially identical to that of the sun, excluding gaseous elements like hydrogen and helium. Notably though, the Orgueil meteor is highly enriched in (volatile) mercury - undetectable in the solar photosphere, and this is a major driver of the "mercury paradox" that mercury abundances in meteors do not follow its volatile nature and isotopic ratios based expected behaviour in the solar nebula.

Because of its extraordinarily primitive composition and relatively large mass, Orgueil is one of the most-studied meteorites.  One notable discovery in Orgueil was a high concentration of isotopically anomalous xenon called "xenon-HL".  The carrier of this gas is extremely fine-grained diamond dust that is older than the Solar System itself, known as presolar grains.

In 1962, Nagy et al. announced the discovery of 'organised elements' embedded in the Orgueil meteorite that were purportedly biological structures of extraterrestrial origin. These elements were subsequently shown to be either pollen (including that of ragwort) and fungal spores (Fitch & Anders, 1963) that had contaminated the sample, or crystals of the mineral olivine.

Seed capsule hoax
In 1965, a fragment of the Orgueil meteorite, kept in a sealed glass jar in Montauban since its discovery, was found to have a seed capsule embedded in it, whilst the original glassy layer on the outside remained apparently undisturbed. Despite great initial excitement, the seed capsule was shown to be that of a European rush, glued into the fragment and camouflaged using coal dust. The outer "fusion layer" was in fact glue. Whilst the perpetrator is unknown, it is thought that the hoax was aimed at influencing 19th century debate on spontaneous generation by demonstrating the transformation of inorganic to biological matter.

Claim of fossils

Richard B. Hoover of NASA has claimed that the Orgueil meteorite contains fossils, some of which are similar to known terrestrial species.  Hoover has previously claimed the existence of fossils in the Murchison meteorite. NASA has formally distanced itself from Hoover's claims and his lack of expert peer-reviews.

See also
 Glossary of meteoritics

References

Further reading
Nagy B, Claus G, Hennessy DJ (1962) Organic Particles Embedded in Minerals in Orgueil and Ivuna Carbonaceous Chondrites. Nature 193 (4821) p. 1129
Fitch FW, Anders E (1963) Organized Element - Possible Identification in Orgueil Meteorite. Science 140 (357) p. 1097
Gilmour I, Wright I, Wright J 'Origins of Earth and Life', The Open University, 1997,

External links
The Orgueil meteorite from The Encyclopedia of Astrobiology, Astronomy, and Spaceflight
The Orgueil meteorite hoax

Meteorites found in France
Astrobiology
Hoaxes in science
Hoaxes in France
1864 in France
1860s in science